Eilish Flanagan (born 2 May 1997) is an Irish long distance runner.

From Gortin in County Tyrone, Flanagan attended Sacred Heart College, Omagh before earning a scholarship at Adams State University in Colorado. Whilst at Adams State she set a new NCAA Division II record in the 1500 metres, and won the 2021 NCAA Division II Outdoor Track & Field Championship in the 3000 metres steeplechase, as well as finishing runner up in the 5,000 metres in 2021 and the 6,000 metres cross country race in 2019. She has run for the Omagh Harriers, and the Carmern Runners Athletics Club. Her twin sister Roisin is also a distance runner and in  scholarship at Adams State University and is the Northern Ireland 5000 metres record holder. Both twins were part of the Irish team which won a women's under-23 team silver medal at the 2019 European Cross Country Championships in Lisbon.

In May 2021, Flanagan beat her personal best by 12 seconds to set a new Northern Ireland 3000 metres steeplechase record of 9 mins 40.68 secs at a meeting in Eugene, Oregon.

In July 2021, she was confirmed as selected on the Ireland team for the delayed 2020 Summer Games in Tokyo to compete in the 3000 metres steeplechase. She ran a personal best time at the Olympics.

References

External links
 
 

1997 births
Living people
Irish female middle-distance runners
Irish female steeplechase runners
Steeplechase runners from Northern Ireland
Female middle-distance runners from Northern Ireland
Athletes (track and field) at the 2020 Summer Olympics
Olympic athletes of Ireland
Sportspeople from County Tyrone
Adams State Grizzlies women's track and field athletes
Adams State Grizzlies women's cross country runners